Michał Krzysztof Skóraś (born 15 February 2000) is a Polish professional footballer who plays as a winger for Ekstraklasa side Lech Poznań and the Poland national team.

Career statistics

Club

Honours
Lech Poznań
 Ekstraklasa: 2021–22

Individual
Ekstraklasa Young Player of the Month: April 2022

References 

2000 births
Living people
People from Jastrzębie-Zdrój
Polish footballers
Poland international footballers
Poland youth international footballers
Poland under-21 international footballers
Association football midfielders
Lech Poznań II players
Lech Poznań players
Bruk-Bet Termalica Nieciecza players
Raków Częstochowa players
I liga players
II liga players
III liga players
Ekstraklasa players
2022 FIFA World Cup players